Songs for the General Public is the third studio album by American rock band The Lemon Twigs. It was released on August 21, 2020 by 4AD. It was co-produced by Jonathan Rado of indie rock band Foxygen. The release was due for May 1, 2020 but postponed due to the COVID-19 pandemic. 

The album consists of 12 tracks written and performed mostly by brothers Brian and Michael D'Addario.

Critical reception
Songs for the General Public received favorable reviews from most music critics. On Metacritic, the album holds an average critic score of 75, based on 18 critics, indicating "generally favorable reviews".

Track listing

Personnel
Credits adapted from Songs for the General Public album liner notes.

The Lemon Twigs
 Brian D'Addario – Vocals, ARP Synthesizer, Bas Dessus, Cello, Composer, Drums, DX-7, E-Bow, Group Member, Guitar, Mini Moog, Mix Control, Piano, Prophet 5, String Arrangements, Woodwind Arrangement
 Michael D'Addario – Vocals, Arp Strings, Bass, Bells, Cello, Composer, Drums, Group Member, Guitar, Mix Control, Piano, String Arrangements, Tambourine, Vocal Arrangement, Woodwind Arrangement, Wurlitzer

Additional musicians
 Jonathan Rado – Synthesizer
 Sean Dancy – Vocal Arrangement
 Michael Alampi – Flute
 Maite Christi Francios – Vocals
 Yolando Dancy – Vocals
 Kanisha Moten – Vocals
 Kaitlin Wolfberg – Violin
 Daryl Johns – Drums
 Vittorio Mura – Saxophone (Baritone)
 Santosh Sharma – Saxophone (Tenor)
 Elijah Shiffer – Saxophone

Production
 Brian D'Addario – Producer
 Michael D'Addario – Producer, Engineer
 Jonathan Rado – Additional Production, Engineer
 Kevin Basko – Engineer
 Rias Reed – Engineer
 Carl Bespolka – Assistant Engineer
 Andrew Hunt – Assistant Engineer
 Greg Calbi – Mastering
 Joe Nino-Hernes – Lacquer Cut

Artwork
 Michael D'Addario – Art Direction, Layout
 Alison Fielding – Art Direction, Layout
 Michael Hili – Photography
 Jayme Paradiso – Hair
 Jessica McFarland – Wings

References

2020 albums
The Lemon Twigs albums
4AD albums
Albums produced by Jonathan Rado
Progressive pop albums